Coimbatore–Chennai Central Superfast express (Train Nos 12681/12682) is a weekly express train run by Indian Railways between Coimbatore city Junction and Chennai Central.

Service

Schedule

Route and stations
This train passes through 5 intermediate stations including Tiruppur, Erode, Salem, Katpadi and Arakkonam.

Hault

All Stops for 12681 Runs only on Saturday

All Stops for 12682 Runs only on Friday

Rake Sharing
The Coimbatore–Chennai Central express has rake sharing arrangement with the (Train No 12647/12648) Kongu Express.

LOCO
The train is pulled by WAP-4 from Erode or Arakkonam.

Coach Composition

The train has standard ICF rakes with max speed of 110 kmph.

 1 AC II Tier
 2 AC III Tier
 14 Sleeper Coaches
 3 General
 2 Second-class Luggage/parcel van

References

External links
 12681 Time Table
 12682 Time Table
 12647 Time Table

Transport in Chennai
Express trains in India
Transport in Coimbatore
Rail transport in Tamil Nadu